Daphné Dumery (born 4 January 1974 in Blankenberge) is a Belgian politician and is affiliated to the N-VA. She was elected as a member of the Belgian Chamber of Representatives in 2010.

Notes

1974 births
Living people
People from Blankenberge
New Flemish Alliance politicians
Members of the Chamber of Representatives (Belgium)
21st-century Belgian politicians
21st-century Belgian women politicians